HMS Narborough was an  built for the Royal Navy during the First World War. She was wrecked after running aground in 1918.

Description
The Admiralty M class were improved and faster versions of the preceding . They displaced . They were powered by three Parsons direct-drive steam turbines, each driving one propeller shaft, using steam provided by four Yarrow boilers. The ships' complement was 76 officers and ratings.

The ships were armed with three single QF  Mark IV guns and two QF 1.5-pounder (37 mm) anti-aircraft guns. These latter guns were later replaced by a pair of QF 2-pounder (40 mm) "pom-pom" anti-aircraft guns. The ships were also fitted with two above water twin mounts for  torpedoes.

Construction and service
Narborough was ordered under the Fourth War Programme in February 1915 and built by John Brown & Company at Clydeside. The ship was laid down in May 1915, launched on 3 March 1916 and completed in April 1916. She was named for Rear Admiral Sir John Narborough (1640-1688).

On commissioning, Narborough joined the 13th Destroyer Flotilla, part of the Battlecruiser Force of the Grand Fleet. Narborough was one of ten destroyers of the 13th Flotilla that took part in the Battle of Jutland on 31 May–1 June 1916, supporting Admiral Beatty's battlecruisers. At 16:09 hr, the 13th Flotilla was ordered to launch a torpedo attack against German battlecruisers, while at almost the same time, the German 9th Torpedo-boat flotilla was ordered to attack the British battlecruisers. Narborough did not open fire during this clash.

Narborough continued as part of the 13th Destroyer Flotilla until transferring to the 12th Destroyer Flotilla of the Grand Fleet in November 1917. She was at sea screening the 1st Battle Squadron during the Second Battle of Heligoland Bight on 13 November 1917, but did not see action. On 12 January 1918, she and her sister ship, were wrecked on the cliffs at Hesta Rock, just to the north of Windwick Bay, South Ronaldsay. Only one sailor survived; 188 were killed. Most of the casualties were never found and are commemorated on the Portsmouth Memorial.

Notes

Bibliography

External links
 Admiralty Board of Enquiry

 

Admiralty M-class destroyers
Ships built on the River Clyde
1916 ships
World War I destroyers of the United Kingdom
Maritime incidents in 1918
World War I shipwrecks in the North Sea